Solomon Islands competed in the 2014 Commonwealth Games in Glasgow, Scotland from 23 July to 3 August 2014. Participating in their eighth Commonwealth Games, the Solomons have never yet won a medal.

Athletics

Men
Track & road events

Women
Track & road events

Judo

Men

Table Tennis

Singles

Triathlon

Individual

Weightlifting

Men

Women

Wrestling

Men's freestyle

References

Nations at the 2014 Commonwealth Games
Solomon Islands at the Commonwealth Games
2014 in Solomon Islands sport